Nur (Bashkir and ) is a rural locality (a village) in Chekmagushevsky District, Bashkortostan, Russia. The population was 68 as of 2010. There is 1 street.

Geography 
Nur is located 20 km southeast of Chekmagush (the district's administrative centre) by road. Urnyak is the nearest rural locality.

References 

Rural localities in Chekmagushevsky District